Love and Theft is the second studio album by the American country music duo of the same name. It was released on July 24, 2012, via RCA Nashville.  The album includes the number 1 single "Angel Eyes." The album's second single, "Runnin' Out of Air," was released to country radio in November 2012. The album's third single, "If You Ever Get Lonely", was released to country radio on June 3, 2013. This song was originally recorded by John Waite on his 2011 album Rough & Tumble.

The album debuted at No. 21 on Billboard 200 and No. 4 on Top Country Albums, with 14,000 copies sold in its first week. The album has sold 96,000 copies as of February 2015.

Track listing

Personnel

Love and Theft
Stephen Barker Liles - lead vocals, background vocals
Eric Gunderson - lead vocals, background vocals

Additional Musicians
 Tom Bukovac - electric guitar
 John Catchings - cello
 Smith Curry - dobro, steel guitar, lap steel guitar
 Eric Darken - percussion
 Dan Dugmore - steel guitar
 Shannon Forrest - drums
 Larry Franklin - fiddle
 Tony Harrell - keyboards, synthesizer strings
 Josh Leo - acoustic guitar, electric guitar, lap steel guitar
 Michael Rhodes - bass guitar
 Ilya Toshinsky - acoustic guitar, mandolin
 Nir Z. - drums

Chart performance

Album

Singles

References

2012 albums
Love and Theft (duo) albums
RCA Records albums
Albums produced by Josh Leo